Guayatá is a town and municipality in the Eastern Boyacá Province, part of the Colombian department of Boyacá.

Borders 
 North with Guateque
 West with Manta, Cundinamarca
 South with Gachetá and Ubalá, Cundinamarca
 East with Somondoco and Chivor

Etymology 
The name Guayatá comes from Chibcha and is either a combination of tá; "land over there" or "farmfields" and Guaya, a creek running through Tenza or from Guaitá; "domain of the female cacique".

History 
In the times before the Spanish conquest of the central highlands of the Colombian Andes, the area around Guayatá was inhabited by the Muisca. Organized in their loose Muisca Confederation, they were an advanced agricultural civilization. Within present-day Guayatá cotton was cultivated, important for the mantle making of the Muisca. Also feathers of hunted birds were traded in and around Guayatá.

At the time of the arrival of the Spanish conquistadores, in Guayatá money was found that consisted of small pieces of cloth, gold or emeralds. The golden disks used as money were not decorated yet plain. Knowledge about the Muisca in the early colonial period has been provided by friar Pedro Simón.

Modern Guayatá was founded on April 6, 1821, by Andrés José Medina Narciso; months before the dissolution of the Spanish colonial period and independence of the Republic of Gran Colombia.

Economy 
Principal economic activity of Guayatá is agriculture, mainly maize, arracacha, bananas, yuca, beans, potatoes, coffee, pumpkins and peas. Famous product of Guayatá are the bread rolls (mogollas).

Trivia 
 Market day: Tuesday
 Median temperature: 19 °C
 DANE code: 15325

Born in Guayatá 
 Roberto "Pajarito" Buitrago, former professional cyclist

References 

Municipalities of Boyacá Department
Populated places established in 1821
Muisca Confederation
Muysccubun